Time and Tide is an album of original songs by British singer-songwriter Steve Ashley. It was released by Topic Records on 16 July 2007.

Reception
Reviewing the album for The Guardian, Robin Denselow said that Ashley "has continued to develop as a thoughtful songwriter and social commentator. On his new set, the gentle, sturdy melodies are matched with a rare blend of emotion and anger".

Pete Cann, writing in The Oxford Times, described the album as "a journey through Blair's Britain...a commentary on the despair of Blair's legacy". The "outstanding track" said Cann, is Ashley's "moving tribute to his grandfather, a railwayman and union organiser, Down the Line. The tune is traditional and the words heartfelt".

Track listing
The North West Wind 	5:37
 	Still Waiting 	3:55
 	The Birds of the Country 	1:41
 	Lands End 	4:08
 	The Drowning Cell 	4:41
 	Friend of the Rivers 	2:16
	Ships of Shame 	3:36
 	Down The Line 	6:01
 	A Time-Honoured Way 	2:35
 	The Vintners 	0:39
 	Pub Carpets 	1:39
 	The Refugees 	4:08
 	This Old English Town 	3:38
 	A Better Day 	3:28
 	Best Wishes 2:41

Personnel
 Steve Ashley – vocals, acoustic guitar, harmonica, bells, whistle, drum
 Sarah Bushnell – viola
 Dik Cadbury – backing vocals, electric bass, keyboards, percussion
 Lesley Jackson – violin
 Chris Leslie – fiddle, mandolin
 Susannah Mahler – violin
 Paul Manning – piano accordion
 Simon Nicol – electric guitar
 Dave Pegg – acoustic bass, mandolin
 Tommy Scott – drums, keyboard, piano
 Geoff Short – violin
 Steve Trigg – trumpet
 Ness Whiffin – violin
 Lesley Willcocks – cello
 Robin Williamson – harp
 John Wilshaw – hurdy gurdy

References

External links
Official website: Steve Ashley

2007 albums
Steve Ashley albums